This is a list of newspapers in Hawaii.

Daily and weekly newspapers (currently published)This is a list of daily newspapers currently published in Hawaii. For weekly newspapers, see List of newspapers in Hawaii.

 The Garden Island - Lihue 
 Hawaii 24/7 - Hilo
 Hawaii Catholic Herald
 Hawaii Hochi - (English, Japanese)
 Hawaii Tribune-Herald
 Honolulu Star-Advertiser
 Mauitime - Wailuku
 The Maui News - Wailuku
 Molokai Advertiser-News
 Pacific Business News
 West Hawaii TodayUniversity newspapers
 Ka Leo O Hawaii - University of Hawaii at Manoa
 Ke Kalahea - University of Hawaii at Hilo and Hawaii Community College

Defunct
 Hawaiian Gazette (1865-1918)
 Hawaii Island Journal
The Honolulu Advertiser
Honolulu Record
Honolulu Star-Bulletin
Honolulu Weekly
Molokai Island Times

See also

References